Group E of the 2022 African Nations Championship, consisting of Cameroon, Congo and Niger, began on 16 January and will end on 24 January 2023.

Teams

Standings

Matches

Cameroon vs Congo

Congo vs Niger

Niger vs Cameroon

Discipline
Fair play points would have been used as tiebreakers if the overall and head-to-head records of teams were tied. These were calculated based on yellow and red cards received in all group matches as follows:
first yellow card: −1 point;
indirect red card (second yellow card): −3 points;
direct red card: −4 points;
yellow card and direct red card: −5 points;

Only one of the above deductions was applied to a player in a single match.

References

External links

2022 African Nations Championship